K. C. Ganesan is an Indian politician and former Member of the Legislative Assembly of Tamil Nadu. He was elected to the Tamil Nadu legislative assembly as a Dravida Munnetra Kazhagam candidate from Jayankondam constituency in 1989, and 1996 elections.

References 

Dravida Munnetra Kazhagam politicians
Living people
Tamil Nadu MLAs 1996–2001
Year of birth missing (living people)